Kepler-560b, or more correctly Kepler-560 Bb, is a confirmed exoplanet orbiting the secondary star of the binary star system Kepler-560. It is only 287 light-years away. Though not listed in the Habitable Exoplanets Catalog, one study gives the planet an 85% chance of being in the habitable zone.

See also 

 Kepler-705b

References 

Exoplanets discovered in 2016
Transiting exoplanets
Exoplanets discovered by the Kepler space telescope